Holy Cross and St Helen Church is a Roman Catholic church in St Helens, Merseyside. The church was built in 1860 by the Society of Jesus. It was designed by Joseph John Scoles and is a Grade II listed building.

History
The church was founded by the Society of Jesus in 1860. Fr Thomas Seed, the head of the Jesuits in Britain, who also founded Sacred Heart Church in Edinburgh laid the foundation stone of the church on 3 May 1860, what was then Feast of the Finding of the True Cross.

The church was designed by Joseph John Scoles who also designed St Ignatius Church, Preston in Lancashire, Immaculate Conception Church, Farm Street in London and the Church of Saint Francis Xavier, Liverpool. Construction of the church lasted for almost two years and the church was opened on 1 May 1862.

In the church there is a memorial stone dated 1933, showing when the Jesuits handed over the church to the Archdiocese of Liverpool, who have continued to administer it ever since.

Parish
Sunday Mass is at 10am. Weekday Masses are as follows: 12.15pm on Monday, Wednesday, Thursday and Friday, and 11am on Tuesday. Confessions are from 11am to 11.45am before the 12.15pm Mass. There are no confessions on Tuesdays. In addition Exposition takes place on Monday, Wednesday and Friday (half an hour before and after Mass).

Entrance to the church is via Corporation Street (southern side) or Parade Street (northern side), where there is also an additional gate for level access. The original front entrance is no longer used.

In July 2020, the church of SS Peter & Paul, Haresfinch was closed, and this parish was merged into the parish of Holy Cross and St Helen under its former Parish Priest, Rev. Fr. Kevan O'Brien.

Gallery

See also
 Listed buildings in St Helens, Merseyside

References

External links
 Archdiocese of Liverpool website

Grade II listed churches in Merseyside
Roman Catholic churches in Merseyside
Holy Cross Church
Roman Catholic churches completed in 1862
Grade II listed Roman Catholic churches in England
1862 establishments in England
Gothic Revival architecture in Merseyside
Gothic Revival church buildings in England
19th-century Roman Catholic church buildings in the United Kingdom